This article is a list of luk khrueng, people of mixed European (or other race) and Thai origins.

Academia, science and technology

 Robert Dirks (Thai mother, American father)
 Giles Ji Ungpakorn (Thai father, English mother)

Entertainment and media

Film, actors and model
Alex Rendell (Thai mother, English father)
Amanda Obdam (Thai mother, Canadian father)
Ananda Everingham  (Lao mother, Australian father)
Anchilee Scott-Kemmis (Thai mother, Australian father)
Ann Thongprasom (Thai mother, Swedish father)
Anntonia Porsild (Thai mother, Danish father)
Araya A. Hargate (Thai mother, English father)
Arayha Suparurk (Thai mother, Austrian father)
Art Supawatt Purdy  (Thai mother,  American father)
Carissa Springett (Thai mother, English father)
Charlie Trairat (Thai mother, Dutch father)
Chrissy Teigen (Thai mother, American father)
Cindy Bishop (Half English, one quarter Indian and one quarter Thai mother, American father)
Colin Ryan (Thai mother, English father)
Davika Hoorne (Thai mother, Belgian father)
Jarunee Suksawat  (Thai mother, French father)
Johnny Anfone (Thai German mother, Filipino father)
Kimberly Ann Voltemas (Thai mother, German father)
Kathaleeya McIntosh (Thai mother, Scottish father)
Nadech Kugimiya (Thai mother, Austrian father)
Maria Poonlertlarp (Thai mother, Swedish father)
Mario Maurer (Thai mother, German father)
Mick Tongraya (Thai mother, Danish father)
Pamela Pasinetti (Thai mother, Italian father)
Paula Taylor (Thai mother, British father)
Paweensuda Drouin (Thai mother, Canadian father)
Praya Lundberg  (Thai mother, Swedish father)
Ranee Campen (Thai mother, English father)
Rasri Balenciaga (Thai mother, Spanish father)
Rebecca Patricia Armstrong (Thai mother, British father)
Sammy Cowell (Thai mother, English father)
Sara Malakul Lane (Thai mother, English father)
Sonia Couling (Thai mother, English father)
Sririta Jensen (Thai mother, Danish father)
Sunny Suwanmethanont (Thai, Singapore and French)
Tera Patrick (Thai mother, American father)
Tommy Hatto (Thai mother, English father)
Toon Hiranyasap (Thai mother, Filipino father)
Urassaya Sperbund (Thai mother, Norwegian father)
Vachirawit Chiva-aree (Half Thai, Half Chinese mother, Half American, Half Thai father)
Willy McIntosh (Thai mother, Scottish father)

Singers and musicians
 Andrea Suárez  (Thai-American-Spanish-Puerto Rican)
 Billy Ogan (Thai mother, Filipino father)
 Anan Anwar (Australian mother, Indonesian father)
 Myria Benedetti (Thai mother, Swiss father)
 Krissada Sukosol Clapp (Thai mother, American father)
 Lanna Commins (Thai mother, Australian father)
 Peter Corp Dyrendal (Thai mother, Danish father)
 Katreeya English (Thai mother, British father)
 Jakrapun Kornburiteerachote (Thai mother, American father)
 Joni Anwar  (Australian mother, Indonesian father)
 Louis Scott  (Thai mother, Scottish father)
 Chinawut Indracusin (Thai father, French mother)
 Conrad Keely (Thai, Irish, English)
 Roy Khan (Thai father, Norwegian mother)
 Rhema Marvanne (Thai father, American mother)
 Thongchai McIntyre (Thai Malay mother, Thai Swiss father)
 Thomas Meglioranza (Thai mother, American father)
 Thierry Mekwattana  (Swiss mother, Thai Chinese father)
 Myra Molloy (Thai mother, American father)
 Palmy (Thai mother, Belgian father)
 Nicole Theriault (Thai mother, American father)
 David Usher (Thai mother, Canadian father)
 Marsha Vadhanapanich (Thai father, German mother)
 Violette Wautier (Thai mother, Belgian father)
 Jannine Weigel (Thai mother, German father)
 Tata Young (Thai mother, American father)
 Christina Aguilar (Vietnamese mother, Filipino father)

Royalty and nobility

Princes and princesses
 Prince Chula (son of Prince Chakrabongse and his Ukrainian wife)
 Princess Charulaksana (daughter of Prince Rangsit and his German wife)
 Prince Piyarangsit (son of  Prince Rangsit and his German wife)
 Prince Sanidh (son of  Prince Rangsit and his German wife)

Royal descendants
 Mom Rajawongse Biradej Bhanubhand (son of Prince Bira and his Argentine wife)
  Mom Rajawongse Narisa Chakrabongse (daughter of Prince Chula and his British wife)

Khun

 Khun Ploypailin (daughter of  Princess Ubolratana and her American husband)
 Khun Poom (son of  Princess Ubolratana and her American husband)
 Khun Sirikitiya (daughter of  Princess Ubolratana and her American husband)

No title
 Chulachak Chakrabongse (son of  Mom Rajawongse Narisa Chakrabongse and her British husband)
 Leonardo Wheeler (son of Khun Ploypailin and her American husband)
 Maximus Wheeler (son of Khun Ploypailin and her American husband)

Politics
Prayoon Pamornmontri (Thai father, German mother)
 Tammy Duckworth (Thai mother, American father)
 John Pippy (Thai mother, American father)
 Jon and Giles Ji Ungpakorn (Thai father, English mother)
 Mechai Viravaidya (Thai father, Scottish mother)
 Yuranunt Pamornmontri (son of Prayoon Pamornmontri)

Sports
Aree Song (Thai mother, Korean father)
Naree Song (Thai mother, Korean father)
Alexander Albon (Thai mother, English father)
Dennis Buschening (Thai mother, German father)
 Amanda Mildred Carr (Thai mother, American father)
 Charyl Chappuis (Thai mother, Swiss father)
 Johnny Damon (Thai mother, American father)
 Geoff Huegill (Thai mother, Australian father)
 Kevin Kaesviharn (Thai father, American mother)
 Eric Koston
 August Gustafsson Lohaprasert (Thai father, Swedish mother)
 Tom Ramasut
 Sandy Stuvik
 Jamie Waite (Thai mother, British father)
 Michelle Waterson
 Mika Chunuonsee  (Welsh mother, Thai father)
Geoffrey Prommayon  (Thai mother, American father)
 Tristan Do (French mother, Vietnamese-Thai father)
 Tiger Woods (Thai mother, American father)

References

Lists of Thai people
Thai people of European descent
European